The 2016 FIG World Cup circuit in Rhythmic Gymnastics includes ten category B events.

With nine stopovers in Europe and one in Asia, the competitions are slated for February 26–28 in Espoo (FIN), March 17–20 in Lisbon (POR), April 1–3 in Pesaro (ITA), May 13–15 in Tashkent (UZB), May 20–22 in Minsk (BLR), May 27–29 in Sofia (BUL), June 3–5 in Guadalajara (ESP), July 1–3 in Berlin (GER), July 9–10 in Kazan (RUS), and July 22–24 in Baku (AZE).

The world ranking points collected by the competitors at their best four World Cup events will add up to a total, and the top scorers in each discipline will be crowned winners of the overall series at the final event in Baku, Azerbaijan.

Formats

Medal winners

All-around

Individual

Group all-around

Apparatus

Hoop

Ball

Clubs

Ribbon

5 Ribbons

2 Hoops and 6 Clubs

Overall medal table

See also
 2016 FIG Artistic Gymnastics World Cup series

References

Rhythmic Gymnastics World Cup
2016 in gymnastics